Proales is a genus of rotifers belonging to the family Proalidae.

The genus has cosmopolitan distribution.

Species:

Proales adenodis 
Proales alba 
Proales ardechensis 
Proales baradlana 
Proales bemata 
Proales christinae 
Proales cognita 
Proales commutata 
Proales coryneger
Proales cryptopus 
Proales daphnicola 
Proales decipiens 
Proales doliaris 
Proales fallaciosa 
Proales francescae 
Proales gammaricola 
Proales germanica 
Proales gigantea 
Proales gladia 
Proales globulifera 
Proales gonothyraeae 
Proales granulosa 
Proales halophila 
Proales indirae 
Proales kostei 
Proales laticauda 
Proales latrunculus 
Proales lenta 
Proales lenta 
Proales litoralis 
Proales macrura 
Proales micropus 
Proales minima 
Proales oculata 
Proales ornata 
Proales othodon
Proales paguri 
Proales palimmeka 
Proales parasita 
Proales phaeopis 
Proales prehensor
Proales provida 
Proales pugio 
Proales reinhardti 
Proales segnis 
Proales similis 
Proales simplex 
Proales sordida 
Proales syltensis 
Proales theodora 
Proales werneckii 
Proales wesenbergi

References

Rotifers